Bintou (also known as A Close-Up on Bintou) is a 2001 Burkinabé short film directed by Fanta Régina Nacro. It formed part of the 2002 collection Mama Africa.

Plot
Mother-of-three Bintou, is beaten by her husband Abel, for using housekeeping money to pay for her daughter to go to school to receive the education that she was denied in her own childhood. He believes that only his sons should be educated. Since her husband refuses to pay for a daughter to be educated, Bintou is determined to earn the money herself, however, the only skill she has is growing millet sprouts. She has to find the pots, and obtain sacks of millet from the storekeeper, while her husband continually sabotages her efforts.

Cast
Hyppolite Ouangrawa as Abel, Bintou's husband
Alima Salouka as Bintou

Awards
Bintou won several festival awards in 2001 and 2002 including at the Cannes Film Festival, Amiens International Film Festival, Bermuda International Film Festival, Clermont-Ferrand International Short Film Festival, Marrakech International Film Festival and the Ouagadougou Panafrican Film and Television Festival.

References

External links

 Bintou at the director's official site

2001 films
More-language films
2001 short films
Burkinabé drama films
Burkinabé short films
French drama short films
2000s French films